was a Japanese politician and diplomat. Between 1976 and 1977, he served as Foreign Minister under Prime Minister Takeo Fukuda. He was the son and father of two former Prime Ministers, Ichirō and Yukio respectively.

Early years 
Hatoyama was born in Tokyo to a high-profile family. He studied at the University of Tsukuba.

Iichirō was a 1941 graduate of Tokyo Imperial University's School of Law; but despite family pressure, he resisted going into law or politics. Instead, he decided to become a public servant; but his plans were interrupted by the Pacific War. He enlisted in the Navy, and was presumed dead when the war ended.

At end of the war, Iichirō was one of 6.6 million Japanese military personnel and civilians who were stranded overseas. At the time, this was about 8 percent of Japan's entire population.  These statistics provide a context for understanding what it meant that Iichirō was unable to return home until December 31, 1945.

Family 

Iichirō was the eldest son of Ichirō Hatoyama, who was the Prime Minister of Japan in 1955-1956. His grandfather Kazuo Hatoyama was Speaker of the House of Representative in the first Imperial Diet. Despite family pressure, he was interested in building a life outside the arena of Japanese politics; and his sons also grew to become independent-minded men.

Iichirō is the father of Yukio Hatoyama, who was the former Prime Minister, following a win by the opposition coalition in the 2009 elections.
 
His wife, Yasuko Hatoyama, is a daughter of Shojiro Ishibashi, the founder of Bridgestone Corporation. The couple have two sons. Kunio Hatoyama, like his brother Yukio, may be described as a fourth generation politician  and most recently the Minister of Internal Affairs and Communications.

The Hatoyamas have been described in the media as the "Kennedys of Japan".

Career 
In 1941, Iichirō joined the Finance Ministry, but this work was interrupted by the Pacific War.

In 1946, he began making a place for himself in the meritocracy of the Budget Bureau.  In this work, he caught the attention of men like Takeo Fukuda, who would figure prominently in later life.

In due course, Iichirō was promoted to the position of Deputy Director General in 1963; and he became Director General in 1965.  He served as administrative Vice Minister in the Finance Ministry from 1971 to 1972. The position of vice minister is the highest rank in the civil service, comparable to that of "permanent secretary" in the British civil service or "undersecretary" in the civil service of the United States government.  The minister is always a politician.

After Iichirō's retirement in 1974, he gave in to long-standing family pressure; and his career in politics began with his election to the House of Councilors (HC) in the Diet.

The capstone of his political career was the period in which he served as Foreign Minister in 1976–1977.

See also 
 Hatoyama (disambiguation)
 Hatoyama Hall

Notes

References 
 Itoh, Mayumi (2003). The Hatoyama Dynasty: Japanese Political Leadership through the Generations. New York: Palgrave Macmillan. , . .
 鳩山会館編 (Hatoyama Kaikan) (1996). 追想鳩山威一郎 (Tsuisō Hatoyama Iichirō). Tokyo: Kadokawa Shoten. , . .
 Tatsuki, Mariko, Tsuyoshi Yamamoto, John Haskell Kemble and Thomas Elliott (1985).  The First Century of Mitsui O.S.K. Lines, Ltd. [Japan]: Mitsui O.S.K. Lines. .

1918 births
1993 deaths
Politicians from Tokyo
University of Tokyo alumni
Members of the House of Councillors (Japan)
Children of prime ministers of Japan
Iichiro
Foreign ministers of Japan
Japanese diplomats
Japanese military personnel of World War II
Liberal Democratic Party (Japan) politicians
Parents of prime ministers of Japan